The Wheelchair Rugby League World Cup is an international wheelchair rugby league tournament contested by the top national teams. The tournament was first held in 2008 as part of the Festival of World Cups held in Australia. The first winners were England who then hosted the tournament in 2013 and lost to France in the final. At the 2017 tournament the title was retained by France who were also the host nation. The 2021 tournament was held in November 2022 as part of the 2021 Rugby League World Cup with eight teams taking part. It was hosted by England who also won the tournament.

History
The inaugural tournament took place as part of the 2008 Festival of World Cups and was held in Sydney, Australia. The four teams participating were Australia, England, France and a Barbarians V Pacific Islands team. The fourth team were a replacement for New Zealand who withdrew before the start of the competition. England were the first winners, defeating hosts Australia 44–12 in the final.

In 2013 the tournament was held in Gillingham, England. The six teams that took part were Australia, England, France, Ireland, Scotland and Wales. France won the competition, defeating England 42–40 in the final. Wales won 16–12 against Australia in the third-place play-off and Ireland defeated Scotland 36–14 to finish fifth.

France hosted the 2017 tournament and won 38–34 in the final against England to retain the title. Seven teams took part in the tournament with the semi-finalists from 2013 placed in Group A and Italy, Spain and Scotland in Group B. Australia, who had intended to host the tournament, finished third after defeating newcomers Italy 58–45. Spain, who were also making their first appearance at the world cup, lost 45–66 to Wales in the fifth-place play-off match.

The 2021 tournament (played in 2022 due to the COVID-19 pandemic) saw the United States compete at the world cup for the first time. Norway, who were also due to make their debut, withdrew from the competition in February 2022. It was the first time that the wheelchair tournament was played simultaneously with the men's and women's competitions. The hosts England defeated France 28–24 in the final in front of a wheelchair rugby league world record crowd of 4,526 at Manchester Central.

Format
The tournament has been played using different formats depending on the number of teams participating. In 2013 the six teams were divided into two groups. Each team played the two teams in their group and one team from the other group. This determined the qualifiers for the semi-finals which were followed by the play-off matches and final. In 2017 the seven teams were also divided into two groups, but this time Group A contained the four top ranked teams and Group B was made up of the lower ranked teams. The top two from Group A qualified for the semi-finals and were joined by the winners of play-offs between the top two Group B teams and the remaining Group A sides. The 2021 tournament had two groups of four teams with the top two from each progressing to the semi-finals.

Trophy

In November 2019 a new trophy for the wheelchair tournament was unveiled. It shares a similar overall appearance to the men's and women's trophies and features imagery of wheelchair athletes in action.

Results

Tournaments

Participating teams

Legend

  = Champions
  = Runners-up
  or  = Third place or semi-finalist
  = Fourth place
 G = Group stage
 P = nation participating in Final Tournament not yet played
 w = nation withdrew from (final) Tournament
 – = nation did not enter competition.
 = Hosts

See also
 Men's Rugby League World Cup
 Women's Rugby League World Cup
 Wheelchair Rugby League European Championship

Notes

References

 
Wheelchair rugby league